Arnaldoa is a genus of flowering plants in the aster family, Asteraceae. It is native to Ecuador and Peru.

These plants are shrubs with spines located at the attachment point of each leaf to the stem. The flower heads contain disc florets in shades of orange, orange-red, purple, or cream. The plants grow on dry, wooded or shrubby slopes at elevations between 1370 and 3000 metres.

 Species
 Arnaldoa argentea C.Ulloa, P.Jørg. & M.O.Dillon – up to 3.5 meters tall with light orange or cream-colored florets (Ecuador)
 Arnaldoa coccinosantha (Muschl.) Ferreyra - Peru
 Arnaldoa macbrideana Ferreyra – purple florets (Peru)
 Arnaldoa weberbaueri (Muschl.) Ferreyra – bright orange-red or occasionally purple florets up to 5 centimeters long (Peru)

References

Asteraceae genera
Barnadesioideae
Flora of South America
Taxa named by Ángel Lulio Cabrera